Ye Olde Starre Inne is a pub in the city centre of York, in England.
The main block of the pub is a timber-framed structure, constructed in the mid-16th century, and a wing to its left was added in about 1600.  By 1644, it was an inn named "The Starre", the buildings lying at the back of a coaching yard, off the north side of Stonegate.  This makes it the pub in York which can demonstrate the earliest date for its licence. After the Battle of Marston Moor the inn was used as a hospital for wounded soldiers.

In 1662, the pub was sold for £250, and in 1683, Edward Thompson inherited it.  In 1733, the pub's landlord was Thomas Bulman, and he signed an agreement with the owners of two shops on Stonegate that he could attach a sign to their premises, to hang across the street.  A sign advertising the pub has hung across the street ever since.

The pub was extended in the early-18th century.  In the 1840s, with the coming of the railway, the coaching yard was infilled with a new building, and the pub is now approached via a passageway underneath part of this building.  Stables lay behind the pub and could be accessed from Duncombe Place, making the pub a popular location for visiting actors and circus performers.

In the late-19th century, the pub was again extended, at which time, it was known as Boddy's Inn.  Surviving internal features include an early-18th century staircase, some 17th-century panelling, and an assortment of benches, glass and panelling from the 19th-century refit.  Its former bar screen, of stained glass, probably dates from the 1890s and is believed to have been designed by J. W. Knowles & Co. who were based at 35 Stonegate.

In 1954, the pub was grade II listed.

References

External links

Buildings and structures completed in the 1500s
Grade II listed pubs in York
Stonegate (York)